Rodolfo Muller (12 August 1876 – 11 September 1947) was an Italian racing cyclist and sports journalist. He finished sixth in the 1898 Paris–Roubaix, but his best season was 1902 with podium finishes in Bordeaux-Paris, Marseille-Paris and the Italian Corsa Nazionale. In that same year he also won the Concours de Tourisme du TCF, the first ever race to include the iconic Col du Tourmalet mountain pass.

Major results
 1897
 3rd Paris-Cabourg
 1898
 6th Paris-Roubaix
 1899
 Record Paris-Torino on motorbike
 1901
 6th Paris-Brest-Paris 
 1902
 1st Le Concours de Tourisme du TCF (First race to include the Col du Tourmalet)
 2nd Marseille-Paris
 3rd Corsa Nazionale / La Seicento
 3rd Bordeaux-Paris
 1903
 4th Tour de France
 1904
 1st 1000 kilometers of the Vélodrome d'Hiver

References

External links
 
Rodolfo MULLER's page at CyclingRanking.com

1876 births
1947 deaths
Italian male cyclists
Sportspeople from Livorno
Cyclists from Tuscany